Dinu Marius Todoran (born 8 September 1978) is a Romanian football manager and former footballer who played as a midfielder for teams such as Petrolul Ploiești, Farul Constanța, Unirea Urziceni or FC Voluntari. After retirement, Todoran started his football manager career and was in charge of FC Voluntari, CSM Slatina and FCSB.

Honours

Player

Unirea Urziceni
Liga I: 2008–09

FC Botoșani
Liga II:  2012–13

FC Voluntari
Liga II:  2014–15
Liga III: 2013–14

External links

1978 births
Living people
Sportspeople from Brașov
Romanian footballers
Association football midfielders
FC Astra Giurgiu players
FCV Farul Constanța players
FC Unirea Urziceni players
FC Petrolul Ploiești players
FC Botoșani players
FC Voluntari players
Liga I players
Liga II players
Romanian football managers
FC Voluntari managers
CSM Slatina (football) managers
FC Steaua București managers